Lucklawhill is a hamlet one mile (1.6 km) northwest of the village of Balmullo in Fife, Scotland.  Historically, Lucklawhill belonged to the Logie parish.

The hill on which it stands is mainly composed of feldspar porphyry, with a summit of compacted feldspar. Late 18th and early 19th century authors wrote that Lucklaw Hill was an ancient hunting park belonging to the Kings of Scotland.

References

Hamlets in Fife
Hills of Fife